Julie Le Breton is a French Canadian actress. She predominantly appears in French-language television series and films.

Biography
She is best known internationally for her appearance in The Rocket, a French Canadian biopic about legendary ice hockey player Maurice "The Rocket" Richard. In this Charles Binamé interpretation, she plays Lucille Richard, the wife of the main character starring Roy Dupuis. For her appearance, she got a nomination for the Jutra Award and won the Genie Award for best leading actress.

She started her career with a leading role in the national television series Watatatow, and often acts in local television drama.

Films

Television

Awards and nominations
 Genie Award, 2007, award for best leading actress in The Rocket
 Jutra Award, 2007, nomination for best actress The Rocket
 Prix Gémaux, 2008, nomination for best actrice in a television drama in Nos Étés
 Prix Gémaux, nomination for best actrice in a comedy in François en série

External links
 
 Julie Le Breton at Northern Stars
 Academy of Canadian Cinema & Television

1975 births
Living people
Best Actress Genie and Canadian Screen Award winners
Canadian film actresses
Canadian television actresses
Canadian voice actresses
French Quebecers